Methylazoxymethanol, MAM, is a carcinogen which reduces DNA synthesis. Its derivatives include methylazoxymethanol acetate and cycasin, which they are found in cycad.

References

Amine oxides
Primary alcohols